Robbie Shaw (born 24 July 1983) is a former international rugby union player who played scrum-half. Shaw played for the United States national rugby union team.

Shaw played for Bristol and was released at the end of the 2010-11 RFU Championship. Shaw joined Bristol after a short stint at Esher. He has also previously played for London Wasps, London Welsh, Connacht and Galwegians. He made one substitute appearance for Connacht on 2 May 2008 against Cardiff Blues.

In July 2011, Welsh region the Scarlets said that Shaw was training with them to be ready for the 2011-12 season.
In June 2013 Shaw signed to play for Esher in National League 1. After a three match stint with London Scottish F.C. during the 2013-14 season Shaw returned to Esher for the 2014-15 season.

International

Shaw has twelve international caps for the United States.  Shaw narrowly missed out on making the United States squad for the 2011 Rugby World Cup.

Shaw also played for the Ireland U21 side that reached the final of the World Championships in 2004. Shaw is also a United Kingdom citizen.

References

External links
 International Profile
 http://www.bristolrugby.co.uk/6257.php
 http://web.usarugby.org/cgi-bin/viadesto/natteams/mnt/15ProfileDetail.pl?playerId=385
 http://www.irishrugby.ie/6855_3346.php

Bristol Bears players
Ohio Aviators players
Living people
1983 births
People educated at the Royal Grammar School, High Wycombe
United States international rugby union players
Rugby union scrum-halves